Kalateh-ye Arabha (also Romanized as Kalāteh-ye ‘Arabhā; also known as Kalāteh-ye ‘Arab) is a village in Kardeh Rural District, in the Central District of Mashhad County, Razavi Khorasan Province, Iran. At the 2006 census, its population was 311, in 78 families.

References 

Populated places in Mashhad County